The  Ōkareka Embayment (also spelled Okareka) is a volcanic feature in Taupo Volcanic Zone of New Zealand. It most significant recent volcanic eruption was about 15,700 years ago and this deposited the widespread Rotorua tephra that reached beyond Auckland.

Geography
The Ōkareka Embayment extends from the western margin of Lake Tarawera to include to its north Lake Okareka and in the east Lake Tikitapu and the western half of Lake Rotokakahi.

Geology

Both the Ōkareka Embayment and the Tarawera Volcanic Complex are inside the old Ōkataina Caldera now often termed the Ōkataina  Volcanic Centre. The newer Haroharo Caldera forms its eastern boundary but is also part of the Ōkataina volcanic centre and some maps of the Horahora Caldera include the embayment.

Eruptions
The Northern Dome, just to the west of Lake Tikitapu formed  over 25,000 years ago in the Te Rere rhyolite eruption. Such domes typically form over a vent that have an initial pyroclastic eruption and the vent(s) for this eruption lies under the Northern and Eastern domes. All the vents in the Ōkareka Embayment lie on the Haroharo linear vent zone's western end.

The Rotorua eruption of 15,700 to 15,800 years ago was a two phase eruption commencing with a plinian eruption that deposited  of material to the northwest from a vent now under the Trig 7693 dome and that lasted no more than 4 days. Significant ash cover was towards the Rotorua area (hence the name) but ash fall was as far away as Auckland.

Tephra Context
As far back as 1839 a German explorer Dr Ernst Dieffenbach described near Rotoroa the first recorded description of layered tephras from ash fall in New Zealand. However correlation between eruption years and what has been coined as tephrostratigraphy is not straightforward where there is no historical written record. Radiocarbon dating was later used in the vicinity to date recent eruptions as deposition of each tephra was followed by a period of quiescence and soil formation. Such a series as published in 1990 (so the dates may have been modified by scientific discourse since) reads (with some translation from original jargon) :
Rotomahana Mud 1886 CE (Tarawera)
Kaharoa 1314 CE (Tarawera)
Taupo 232 CE (Taupo)
Rotokawau 3600 years before 1950 (Rotokawau craters)
Whakatane 5500 years before 1950 (Haroharo)
Mamaku 8000 years before 1950 (Haroharo)
Rotoma 9500 years before 1950 (Haroharo)
Waiohau 14,000 years before 1950 (Tarawera)
Rotorua 15,600 years before 1950 (Okareka/Haroharo)
Rerewhakaaitu (pale layer within grayish loess deposits) 17,600 years before 1950 (Tarawera).  
The impact on the Waikato region must have been marked as lake sediment from near Hamilton, New Zealand shows evidence of very active plant turnover just before almost 5cm of tephra is deposited from the Rotorua event. 

Te Rere tephra from the Northern Dome vent eruption 25,200 ± 9,600  years ago is also widely distributed. 

Okareka Tephra was produced from vents in an eruption of Mount Tarawera 21,900 ± 300 years before present so does not have an origin in the embayment.

Risk
A repeat of the Rotorua eruption with its ash distribution against the prevailing winds but towards the major population centres of Rotoroa, Hamilton and Auckland would be very destructive and disruptive.

References

Taupō Volcanic Zone
Calderas of New Zealand
Rift volcanoes
Okataina Volcanic Centre
VEI-5 volcanoes
Holocene calderas